The 2009 No Surrender was a professional wrestling pay-per-view (PPV) event produced by the Total Nonstop Action Wrestling (TNA) promotion, which took place on September 20, 2009 at the TNA Impact! Zone in Orlando, Florida. It was the fifth event under the No Surrender chronology.

In October 2017, with the launch of the Global Wrestling Network, the event became available to stream on demand. It would later be available on Impact Plus in May 2019.

Storylines

No Surrender featured nine professional wrestling matches that involved different wrestlers from pre-existing scripted feuds and storylines. Wrestlers portrayed villains, heroes, or less distinguishable characters in the scripted events that built tension and culminated in a wrestling match or series of matches.

Results

See also
2009 in professional wrestling

References

External links
TNA Wrestling.com

Impact Wrestling No Surrender
2009 in professional wrestling in Florida
Professional wrestling shows in Orlando, Florida
September 2009 events in the United States
2009 Total Nonstop Action Wrestling pay-per-view events